Sheridan was a small town in southeast King County (Washington).  Some amount of silver mining went on in Sheridan in the 1890s.  There was a post office in Sheridan from 1892 to 1895.  In addition, there was a hotel, store and a mill.

Geography
Sheridan was located near present-day Maple Valley, Washington.

History 
Suquamish tribe chairperson Martha George "was born in Sheridan ... on April 28, 1892, at a logging camp where her mother and grandmother worked as cooks."

References

Ghost towns in King County, Washington